John Parkinson Thompson (September 5, 1856 – August 1, 1938) was a Major League Baseball player. He played for the  1882 Cincinnati Red Stockings and the 1884 Indianapolis Hoosiers in the American Association

External links

1856 births
1938 deaths
Baseball people from Ontario
Bay City (minor league baseball) players
Canadian expatriate baseball players in the United States
Cincinnati Red Stockings (AA) players
Hamilton Primrose players
Hamilton Clippers players
Indianapolis Hoosiers (AA) players
London Cockneys players
Major League Baseball catchers
Major League Baseball outfielders
Major League Baseball players from Canada
Rochester Jingoes players
19th-century baseball players